Yao Xingtong (born 12 April 1983) is a Chinese actress. She is also known as Helen Yao and Anna Yao. Yao is fluent in French and English.

Yao is noted for her roles as Ma Liruo and Coco in the film Life of Sentime (2010) and CZ12 (2012) respectively.

Early life
Yao was born and raised in Nangang District of Harbin, Heilongjiang. Yao graduated from Beijing Film Academy, where she majored in acting.

Acting career
Yao was chosen to act as a supporting actor in several television series, such as Together with You, Police Story, War and Destiny, and Records of Kangxi's Travel Incognito 5.

Yao's first film role was uncredited appearance in the film Growth (2006).

After playing minor roles in various films and television series, Yao received her first leading role in a film called Blossom, for which she received Golden Rooster Award nominations for Best Actress.

In 2009, Yao starred in the romantic comedy film Life of Sentime, alongside Ming Dow and Xia Yu, which earned her a Best Newcomer Award at the Macau International Movie Festival.

Yao gained international fame for her starring role as Coco in CZ12 (2012), a Hong Kong-Chinese action film co-produced, written, directed by, and starring Jackie Chan.

In 2014, Yao played the lead role in Ex-Files, a romantic comedy film co-starring Han Geng.

Filmography

Film

Television series

Awards and nominations

References

External links

1983 births
Living people
Beijing Film Academy alumni
Actresses from Harbin
Chinese film actresses
Chinese television actresses
21st-century Chinese actresses